Nunziata is a surname of Italian origin. The name refers to:
Elena Mauti Nunziata (b. 1946), Italian opera singer
Frances Nunziata (contemporary), Canadian politician from Ontario; city councillor of Toronto
John Nunziata (b. 1955), Canadian politician from British Columbia

Italian-language surnames